The Italo-Yemeni Treaty of 1926 (also known as the Treaty of San'a) was a treaty between the Kingdom of Italy and Mutawakkilite Kingdom of Yemen. The treaty was signed in September 1926 and was described as a friendship treaty. At the time, Italy was ruled by the fascist National Fascist Party with Benito Mussolini as head of government. The treaty recognized Imam Yahya Muhammad Hamid ed-Din as King of Yemen and acknowledged his claims to Aden. The treaty was renewed on October 15, 1937, after Italy had annexed Abyssinia (present-day Ethiopia).

Background
The Red Sea was of strategic importance to the United Kingdom due to both trade and as a route for its navy to pass through in order to reach India among other places. South of Yemen was the British Colony of Aden and Aden Protectorate which were at considerable risk of anti-colonialist rebellions. 

Italy had colonies of its own in the region: Eritrea and Somaliland, both of low profitability. There was expectation that increased ties with Yemen would fuel increased trade with the colonies and bring the region into the Italian sphere of influence. 

The Kingdom of Yemen at this point had its eye on annexing Aden and Imam Yahya also had aspirations for a Greater Yemen.

External links
The foreign office and Anglo-Italian involvement in the Red Sea and Arabia, 1925-28.

1926 in Italy
1926 in North Yemen
September 1926 events
Treaties concluded in 1926
Treaties of the Mutawakkilite Kingdom of Yemen
Interwar-period treaties
Italy–Yemen relations
Treaties of the Kingdom of Italy (1861–1946)